Peter Arthur Cox   (30 October 1922 – 17 November 2018) was a British civil engineer.

Early life
He was born in London in October 1922 and held a Bachelor of Science degree in engineering.

Military career
Cox served as a commissioned officer in the Royal Engineers during the Second World War, being promoted from cadet to lieutenant with 591st (Antrim) Parachute Squadron, Royal Engineers, on 15 August 1943. He was wounded on 17 January 1945 when a pile of mines exploded. He served at the crossing of the Rhine (Operation Varsity) on 24 March 1945 when his glider was the only one to arrive at the correct position at the bridges over the River Issel. He and his small party of Sappers were engaged in heavy fighting before the infantry captured the bridge and they could prepare it for demolition. Cox's party then moved to another bridge, which was under fire and he had to crawl out on his stomach, carrying one explosive charge at a time. The bridge was successfully destroyed before a German armoured counter-attack reached it. Cox was Mentioned in dispatches for his exploits. His war emergency commission was confirmed on 17 November 1948 with seniority of 30 October 1945. He continued in the Territorial Army after the war, and reached the rank of Colonel in 1981.

Engineering career
Cox ended his career as the last senior partner of Rendel, Palmer and Tritton, the consulting firm which under his leadership designed the Thames Barrier.  The firm had been founded in 1838 by James Meadows Rendel and was re-established as Rendel Ltd within the Ingérop group (fr) in 2015. He was also a fellow of the City and Guilds of London Institute. He was elected president of the Institution of Civil Engineers for the November 1980-1 session and was president of the Smeatonian Society of Civil Engineers for 1999.

References

Bibliography 

        
        
        
        
        
        

1922 births
2018 deaths
British civil engineers
Presidents of the Institution of Civil Engineers
Presidents of the Smeatonian Society of Civil Engineers
Fellows of the Royal Academy of Engineering
Royal Engineers officers